Devin Davis may refer to:

 Devin Davis (musician) (fl. 2000s), American indie musician
 Devin Davis (basketball, born 1974), American/Spanish basketball player
 Devin Davis (basketball, born 1995), American basketball player